Podwysokie  is a village in the administrative district of Gmina Skierbieszów, within Zamość County, Lubelskie Voivodeship, in south-eastern Poland.

References

Podwysokie